Mecistocephalus mater is a species of centipede in the Mecistocephalidae family. It is endemic to Australia, and was first described in 1925 by German myriapodologist Karl Wilhelm Verhoeff.

Description
The original description of this species is based on a female specimen measuring 60 mm in length. This species has 49 pairs of legs.

Distribution
The species occurs in coastal north-eastern Queensland. The type locality is Cedar Creek, on the Atherton Tableland.

Behaviour
The centipedes are solitary terrestrial predators that inhabit plant litter and soil.

References

 

 
mater
Centipedes of Australia
Endemic fauna of Australia
Fauna of Queensland
Animals described in 1925
Taxa named by Karl Wilhelm Verhoeff